Vangelis Ploios (November 13, 1937 – February 21, 2020) was a Greek theatrical, film and television actor.

Biography
He was born in Peristeri northwest of Athens on November 13, 1937.  He studied classic ballet at Elli Zouroudi's school. He made his first role in 1953 in the stage of the Rex Theatre in a dancing drama with Elli Zouroudi. He enrolled into the hypocritic by Dimitris Rontiris and phonetic studies and with Joseph Ritsiardis.

In 1956, he started a training as an actor and began his theatrical career.

Between 1998 and 1999, he entered the cycle of theatrical route at the Irodeio with the comedy of Aristophanes.

He also acted in all the roles, proses, operettas, variety, film and television.
In 1978, he entered the Gounaraki-Baxter school and directed Peace by Aristophanes (with a children's production by Sofia Zarabouka) and roles with Lilliputian students at that school.  His representation was realized at the Akropol theatre with great success.

During the era, his direction worked himself into theatre and in film, with all the great and worthy artists of the time and had a brotherly role with actor Dinos Iliopoulos.

He acted for many years with the theatrical company Vasilis Bournellis at the Akropol (Ippokratous), Bournelli (Alexandras Avenue) and Ethnikos Kipos (Syntagma (Constitution) Square).

He toured across Greece with his own company along with other companies as basically stock.  He also toured in Cyprus and Egypt.

He appeared in television with great success in Sto para pente.

He was married with the actress Ria Deloutsi since 1970 and raised a son, Georgios Ploios, who died in a motorcycle accident.  In April 2007, Vangelis raised Vangelakis, Jr. who is also his grandson. He died on February 21, 2020.

Career

Proses
A musical comedy by Al Breffor, only at the Broadway Theatre
Companies: Elli Lambeti, Dinos Iliopoulos, Dimitris Malavetas, Music: Giannis Spanou, Lines: Lefteris Papadopoulos
A comedy with Étiennes Rennes and Alfred Savoire at the Dionyssia Theater
Companies: Dinos Iliopoulos
A comedy at the Diana Theatre
Companies: Nikos Stavridis, Koulis Stoligkas
Cinderella at the Ethnikos Kipos Theatre
A play by Moss Hart and George Kaufman (1962–63) at the Diana Theatre
Companies: Koulis Stoligkas, Anna Matzourani, Marika Krevata, Nikos Xanthopoulos
Role: as Tony
Another play by Moss Hart and George Kaufman (1995–96) at Ilissia Theatre
Companies; Vasia Panagopoulos, D. Iliopoulos, Eleni Anousaki, D. Kallivokas, etc.
Role: as an officer
The Last Fortune by Stefanos Fotiadis at Gloria Theatre
Company: D. Iliopoulos
Vangelis the Coward, by D. Christodoulou at the Dionyssia and Avlea Theatres in Thessaloniki
Company: D. Iliopoulos
Yiannis, Johnny and Ivan by D. Iliopoulou at the Gloria Theatre
Company: D. Iliopoulos
Concerto for a Trombone, by B. Iliopoulou at the Kipou Theater in Thessaloniki
A play by Georges Feydeau at the Glorka and Chatzokou (Thessaloniki) Theatres
Company: D. Iliopoulos
A play by David Herbert Lawrence at the Chatzokou Theatre in Thessaloniki
Companies: Ria Deloutsi-Vangelis Ploios and alongside Dora Anagnostopoulou, Takis Bokalas, Zoi Voudouri and Koastas Fragkiadakis
A play by Yan ed Nartogue, Periodical
Company: Ria Deloutsi-Vangelis Ploios
A play by Stevens
Company: Ria Deloutsi-Vangelis Ploios
A play by Shirley Hertz at the Chatzokou Theatre in Thessaloniki
Companies: Ria Deloutsi-Vangelis Ploios, alongside; Efi Oikonomou, Takis Bokalas, Christos Kritikos
A play by Marcel Asar at the Dionysia Theatre
Company: D. Iliopoulos
A play at the Dionysia Theatre
Company: D. Iliopoulos
Greece of Arkoudea (Η Ελλάδα του Αρκουδέα = I Ellada tou Arkoudea) by D. Kollatou at the Lusitania Theatre
Casanova by Giovanni Giacomo Casanova at the Moussouri Theatre
From Preveza at Sartzetaki (Απ' τον Πρεβέζης στον Σαρτζετάκη) by D. Kollatou at the Moussouri Theatre
One Sunday in New York by Norman Krasna, at the Anna-Maria Kalouta Theatre
Companies: V. Tsiflikas, M, Aliferi, P. Michalopoulos and D. Iliopoulos
A play by G. Kakoulidis at the Menandreio Theatre (named after Menander) (Delfinario)
Companies: [[Th. Karakatsanis, D. Iliopoulos, S. Kalogirou, S. Fokas, P. Pitsouli, Papamatthaiou, etc.
La Mama by André Roussain at Ledra Theatre
Companies: D. Iliopoulos, Kaiti Papanika, etc.
A play starring with Diana at Kalouta Theatre
Alongside: D. Iliopoulos, Kaiti Lambropoulou, G. Moutsios, M. Chalkia, Giouli Iliopoulou, Sofi Zaninou, etc.

Operettas

O vaftistikos (Ο βαφτιστικός) by Theofrastos Sakellaridis at the National Lyric Stage
Role: as Soubretou
I Apahides ton Athinon at Piraeus Theatre
Alongside: Menelaos Theofanidis
Role: as Katsoulino
Carmen by Bizet at the National Lyric Stage
Role: Dancer, soloist

As a reviewer

Let's Visit Cyprus (Πάμε για την Κύπρο = Pame gia tin Kypro) at Papaioannou Theatre
With: Kyriakos Mavresa, M. Nezer, Orestis Makris
Music: G. Mouzaki, Choreographer: Manolis Kastrinos
Aspro mavro kai zero (Άσπρο μαύρο και ζερό = Black and White and a Zero) by N. Tsiforou and A. Sakellariou at the Akropol Theatre
With: Or. Makris, V. Avlonitis, Kaiti Belinda, G. Vasileiadou, R. Vlachopoulou, N. Rizo, Sper. Vrana, etc.
Music: Z. Iakovidis-G. Vella, Choreographer: Manolis Kastrinos
This Drachma is Yours (Αυτή η δραχμή είναι δική σου = Afti i drachmi einai diki sou) by G. Oikonomidis at the Akropol Theatre
With: Georgios Oikonomidis, Chr. Evthymiou, G. Gkonakis, R. Dor, Sper. Vrana, etc.
Granita kai chonaki (Γρανίτα και χωνάκι) by G. Oikonomdis-Giannakopoulou-Assimaki-Nikolaidi at the Rialto Theatre
With: N. Stavridis, K. Chatzichristo, Al. Leivaditis, Kaiti Diridaua, etc.
Music: Joseph Ritsiardis, Dancers: Gianni Fleury
Women and Flowers (Γυναίκες και λουλούδια = Gynaikes kai louloudia by G. Asimakopoulou, V. Spyropoulou, P. Papadakopoulou at the Akropol Theatre
With: K. Mavreas, Orestis Makris, V. Avlonitis, G. Vasileiadou
Music: Menelaos Theofanidos
Twenty Theatres Together (Είκοσι θέατρα μαζί = Eikossi theatra mazi) by Asimakopoulos – Spyropoulos – Papadoukas at the Akropol Theatre
With: Chr. Efthymidou, R. Vlachopoulou, Kaiti Belinda, G. Gkionakis, S. Vrana, N. Janet, S. Parravas, Dora Giannakopoulou, G. Vogiatzis, etc.
Music: L. Markea, Dancers: G. Fleury, Linda Alma, Songs: G. Vogiatzis
Democracy is Dancing (Η δημοκρατία χορεύει = I dimokratia chorevei) by Al. Sakellarios – G. Giannakopoulos at the Akropol Theatre
With: Chr. Efthymiou, R. Vlachopoulou, K. Belinda, G. Gkionakis. Sper. Vrana, Music: L. Markea
Garden Party with Al. Sakellariou and G. Giannakopoulou at the Akropol Theatre
With: R. Vlachopouloum, Chr. Efthymiou, G. Gkionakis, Nini Janet, Spr. Vrana, G, Vogiatzis, Katerina Gogou, etc.
Music: G. Markea, Dances: G. Fleury, Linda Alma
The Astronaut (Η αστροναύτισσα = I astronaftissa) by Il. Limberopoulou at the Bournelli Theatre
With: R. Vlachopoulou, P. Pantzas, N. Janet, I. Vogiatzis, Eleni Prokopioum, V Voulgaridis, A Matsas, etc.
Music: M. Theofanidis and Go Theodosiadis, Dancers; M. Kastrinos, Director: M, Lygizos
Athens Las Vegas (Αθήνα Λας Βέγκας = Athina Las Vegas) by Asimakopoulou=Spyropoulou-Papadouka at the Bournelli Theatre
With: R. Vlachopoulou, St. Paravas, G Kapis, N Janet, V Voulgaridi, K Gogou, G Papazisis, etc.
Music: G. Theodosiadi, Dancers: Manolis Kastrinos
Mini maxi kai sithrou (Μίνι μάξι και σιθρού) by Lyberopoulos-Nikolaidis at the Akropol Theatre
With: G Pantzas, R Vlachopoulou, St. Paravas, G Kapis, N Janet, E Prokopiou, Ria Deloutsi, Sas kastoura, etc.
Music: G Theodosiadis, Dancer: Manolis Kastrinos
Erchontai kai erchontai (Έρχονται δεν έρχονται) by K Nikolaidi-I Liberopoulou at the Ethnikou Kipou Theatre
With: Stavros Paravas, Rena Vlachopoulou, E Prokopiou, N Janet, K Dalis, M Metaxopoulos, N Fondanas, G Dalaras, etc.
Music: Giorgos Mouzakis,
Pou tha vroume arhigo, (Πού θα βρούμε αρχηγό = Where I am Going to Find a Leader) and (Katerina, Wake Up) (Κατερίνα ξύπνα = Katerina Xypna) by G Lazaridis and N Eleftheriou
With: G Konstantinou, Martha Karagianni, St., Prava, M Demiris, R Deloutsi, G Dalis, A Matsas, I Vogiatzis, etc.
Music: L Markea, Dancer: Giannis Fleury
I Ellas xanapsifizei (Η Ελλάς ξαναψηφίζει = Greece Votes Again) by G Lazaridis and N Eleftheriou at Bournelli Theatre
With: Maro Kontou, B Moschona, N Janet, T Miliadis, Vas Tsivlika, N Panastasiou, G Papazissis, D Giannakopoulos, etc.
Music: Giorgos Mouzakis and Lykourgos Markeas
Ti leme akoma dimokratia (Τη λέμε ακόμα δημοκρατία) by G Lazaridis at Kalouta Theatre
With: Anna Kalouta, Giannis Michalopoulos, K Stoligka, Kat Gioulaki, Ria Deloutsi, Ilia Logothetis, K Papanika, Th. Katsadramis, etc.
Music: Mimis Plessas
Pou tha paei pou na vgei (Που θα πάει που θα βγεί = Where Are We Going, Were Are We Going Out) by Minis Traiforou at the Paroquet Theatre
With: Petros Fyssoun, Beata Assimakopoulou, Ria Deloutsi, Manolis Destounis, Danos Lygizos, Kostas Fyssoun, etc.
Muic: Vangelis Lykiardopoulou, Director: Mimis Traiforou
Outside the Teeth (Έξω απ' τα δόντια) and Ta metaxota vrakia... (Τα μεταξωτά βρακιά.....) by Il. Limberopoulos at the Akropol Theatre
With: K Hadjihristos, Thanasis Vengos, K Papanika, M Demiris, Souli Sabah, Ria Deloutsi, V Trifyllis, G Malouchos, etc.
Music: G Theodosiadis, Director: N Katsouridis
Ellinides Ellines (Ελληνίδες Έλληνες) by N Eleftheriou and I Liberopoulos at the Bournelli Theatre
With Hadjihristos, K Papanikas, Souli Sabah, Ria Deloutsi, V Trifylli, G Malouchos, etc.
Music: G Theodosiadis, Director: N Katsouridis
Enas kosmos koulouvachata (Ένας κόσμος κουλουβάχατα) by Ilia Liberopoulou and S Filippouli at the Akropol Theatre
With: St. Paravas, D Stylianopoulou, T Miliadis, B Moschona, Nelly/Nelli Gkini, etc.
Music: N Danikas, Dancer: Maria DePetrillo
Athina mou trelara mou (Αθήνα μου τρελάρα μου) by I Liberopoulos and S Filippoulis at the Bournelli Theatre
With: G Pantza, Nora Valsami, B Moschona, T Miliadis, etc.
Music: G Mouzakis, Dancing and Director: G Fleury
Klepsan ta dis ti kalpi na deis (Κλέψαν τα δις την κάλπη να δεις) by Kambanis-Rizos-Romas-Spyropoulos at the Metropolitan Theatre
With: D. Iliopoulos, G. Papazissis, Katia Athanassiou,m Perzikianidis, N. Tsoukas, M. Chalkia
Music: M. Tagkieris, Director: Venieris
Touvla Lotto kai bourloto (Τούβλα Λόττο και μπουρλότο) by: Spyropoulos-Balafoutis, M. Stoili at the Metropolitan Theatre
With D. Iliopoulos, Nikos Rizos, D. Stylianopoulou, S. Tzevelekos
Music: Z. Iakovidis, Dancing, Director: D. Metaxopoulou
Tapi kai psychraimoi (Ταπί και ψύχραιμοι) by Haris Romas-Chatzisofias at the Kalouta Theater
With: D. Iliopoulos, H. Romas, Panos Michalopoulos, P, Pitsouli, etc.
Music: Loukianos Kilaidonia, Director: N. Zervos
Give the Cake to the People (Dose tourta sto lao) by N. Eleftheriou and N. Atherinou at the Superstar Theatre
With N. Rizos, D. Iliopoulos, Zozo Sapoutzaki, N, Tsouka, And. Douzos, Katia Athanassiou, etc.
Music: Z. Iakovidis, Director: N. Atherinos

He participated in many other roles inside and outside Greece

He took part in the International Showbiz Raptis at the Anatolia Theatre in Thessaloniki, next to the internationally renowned Spanish theatre and film star Sarita Montiel (famous in Greece in the movie La Violetera)

In taverns, Mostros, Plakiotiko Saloni, Gran Chalet, etc., in a revue road with all the worthy people of the nation, and also in refreshments of the time: Armonia, Filadelfeia company, Akron, Ares FIeld (Oikonomidis), etc.

Filmography

He also participated in many video and TV movies with Kostas Voutsas, Rena Vlachopoulou, Panos Michalopoulos, Giannis Gkionakis, etc.

Television

External links

1937 births
2020 deaths
Male actors from Athens